The Great Northern Tunnel is a  double-tracked railway tunnel under downtown Seattle, Washington, completed by the Great Northern Railway in 1905, and now owned by the BNSF Railway, on its Scenic Subdivision.

The southern portal is just north of King Street Station, and the northern in Victor Steinbrueck Park, between Virginia and Pine Streets. The Downtown Seattle Transit Tunnel passes four feet below the Great Northern Tunnel.

Freight and passenger trains use the tunnel, including Amtrak service to Chicago (the Empire Builder) and Vancouver, B.C. (Cascades), and Sound Transit's Seattle–Everett Sounder commuter rail service.

References

External links

BNSF Railway tunnels
Great Northern Railway (U.S.) tunnels
Railroad tunnels in Seattle
Tunnels completed in 1905
1905 establishments in Washington (state)
Underground commuter rail